Contempora House is a historic home located at New City in Rockland County, New York. It is a Streamline Moderne style dwelling built in 1934–1935.  The property consists of the main house with detached studio.  The buildings are constructed of concrete and cinderblock with steel and wood framing and a stucco exterior.  It was designed by architect and planner Paul Lester Wiener (1895–1967).

It was listed on the National Register of Historic Places in 2009.

References

Houses on the National Register of Historic Places in New York (state)
Houses completed in 1935
Streamline Moderne architecture in New York (state)
Houses in Rockland County, New York
National Register of Historic Places in Rockland County, New York